A rack card is a document used for commercial advertising, frequently in convenience stores, hotels, landmarks, restaurants, rest areas and other locations that enjoy significant foot traffic. Rack cards are typically 4 by 9 inches in size and sport high-impact graphic design.

See also
Marketing communications

References

External links
93 Outstanding Rack Card Design Examples

Advertising